The Arlington Plantation House in Washington, Louisiana is an antebellum plantation house with an unusual design that was built in 1829.  It was listed on the National Register of Historic Places in 1982.

It is a two-story brick and frame house, with common bond brick walls on the sides and on the first story of the front.  Its unusual feature is the one-bay three-story front porch on the front five-bay facade.  The porch is made of brick columns supporting a massive pedimented dormer.  A rear porch is conventional, with wooden Doric pillars above brick columns.

References

Houses on the National Register of Historic Places in Louisiana
Houses completed in 1829
Houses in St. Landry Parish, Louisiana
National Register of Historic Places in St. Landry Parish, Louisiana
Plantation houses in Louisiana